Crowd control (also called CC) is a term used in MMORPGs (Massive Multiplayer Online Role-Playing Games) and MOBAs (Multiplayer Online Battle Arenas) to refer to the ability to partially or completely disable one or more players or mobs, hence limiting the number of opponents actively fighting during an encounter. It can also refer to abilities that influence or prevent the abilities or actions of other characters. Crowd control can be extremely powerful, controlling the possible outcomes of an encounter, as it forces opponents to use a smaller set of abilities/actions.  Players use crowd control to create offense/defense ratio imbalances between themselves and their opponents; used properly, CC often renders an opponent nearly useless, allowing the CCer to use abilities/actions against an opponent without fear of retaliation or response.  In a group setting, crowd control often makes combat safer, easier, or viable.

Types of crowd control
All crowd control abilities fall into one or more of three broad categories.

Movement modifiers
The ability to move faster than an opponent provides a form of crowd control, often through kiting.  Any modifier that decreases an opponent's speed will allow more efficient kiting.

Many forms of crowd control use this type of modifier.  Traditionally, "root" and "snare" effects that directly modify opponents' movement rates by lowering them or simply preventing movement have been the staple of this type of crowd control.

The abilities include, but are not limited to:

 Trapping - situates the target(s) in an area where they have limited movement.
 Poison - poisons the targeted character doing damage over time, usually slowing the target
 Root - immobilizes character while allowing all other actions to occur
 Cripple/Snare - Movement speed debuffs 
 Knockback - forces opponents away from the CCer
 Levitate - allows CCer to use terrain advantages to line-of-sight or safely fall from a height in order to cover more ground than normally possible
 Direction changes - forces opponents to move in another direction, often resulting in tempo or distance gains for the CCer
 Fear/Stun/Mesmerize ("mez")/Charm - robust CC abilities that usually include other types of CC alongside one from the above list

Action/ability rate modifiers
Abilities that can decrease the number of times one can perform an action in a given time (usually by increasing cast time and/or cooldown time) or stop a player from performing actions all together.

Abilities in this group may include, but are not limited to:
 Silence – Prevents the target from using spells or other such abilities, limiting their usefulness in a fight
 Disarm – The target is unable to attack normally via physical means/autoattacks, sometimes due to the target losing their weapon
 Magic Immunity – While technically a buff, a target that is magic immune cannot be affected by magical abilities
 Interrupt – An extremely brief stun that can easily disrupt channelled abilities

These abilities can also affect the amount of "energy" to perform an action, be it mana or otherwise.

Others can decrease damage given from actions, or increase healing from allies.

Forced action modifiers
This is the most unusual category of crowd control spells, but abilities that fall under it are often considered the most powerful. These abilities force an opponent to use certain abilities without their consent.

Examples include, but are not limited to:

 Mind Control – takes control of the opponent and allows one to use some or all of their abilities
 Charm – forces opponent to fight for the caster (against its real allies)
 Fear – forces opponents to run away from the user.
 Feign death – makes it less likely or impossible for an opponent to attack the user.
 Taunt – forces opponents to attack the user.
 Blind - removes opponents ability to see surrounding area.

EverQuest

Crowd control is generally considered critical in EverQuest, because most monsters in the modern version of the game are a match for an entire group of player characters.

In EverQuest, crowd control is usually handled by the Enchanter and Bard classes, who can mesmerize ("mez") opponents through spells or songs. These stop a monster from being able to attack players; however, if the monster is affected in such a way that its hit points are reduced, the mesmerization is broken and the monster will immediately begin to attack. The duration of these effects varies by class and level. Bards can generally only mesmerize for 18 seconds at a time, but higher level Enchanters can mesmerize monsters for upwards of 72 seconds. Several types of monsters are entirely immune to this effect, and all mesmerization spells will only mesmerize monsters up to a certain level.

Stuns can be used for crowd control in EQ as well. Enchanters are the primary class for this method, with a full range of point-blank AOE (PBAOE) stuns. With three or more loaded PBAOE stuns, they can "stun lock" opponents by casting the next stun before their previous stun expires. Some other classes, such as the Cleric and Necromancer, also have a limited ability to perform crowd control in this fashion, generally by using short-duration targeted stuns.

Another method of Everquest crowd control is to keep the monster occupied, such as by assigning a player to "tank" it. This is made much more effective by the use of abilities that Taunt targets, forcing them to attack the user. Only certain classes can Taunt.  Monsters can also be charmed and sent against other mobs. Only creatures up to a certain level can be charmed, and charms are usually of random duration. With additional skills, charms can be made fixed duration or even permanent. Charms generate a lot of hate, so the character doing the charming runs the risk of becoming the target of attacks from the mob.

World of Warcraft
In World of Warcraft different classes have different crowd control abilities.  As of version 1.12, every class has at least one spell that can render an enemy target (player or non-player) unable to move and/or attack for a short period of time. Some of these spells have a cooldown, while others can be chain cast and used to incapacitate a non-player target for as long as required.

In general, longer and more powerful crowd control effects render the victims immune to damage or will break after they take damage, and in PvP combat these effects have so-called diminishing returns, which means applying the same effect repeatedly will decrease the length of the effect for the next application.  Generally, the third application of the same effect in a short period of time renders the target immune to that effect for 15 seconds, which is also the time for the diminishing returns' timers for an effect to reset.

Death knights can silence enemies and interrupt their spell-casting, stop them and make them gradually regain their full movement speed, and if specialized for it, fully incapacitate all targets around them for a short period of time by encasing them in blocks of ice. In addition, death knights have a unique spell called Death Grip, which can also be considered a crowd control effect as the ability instantly pulls an enemy target to them.

Druids can put beast and dragonkin type monsters to sleep, root enemies in place with a vine spell, and incapacitate any enemy (player or non-player) for a short duration with Cyclone, which causes the victim to be immune to any damage or healing.

Hunters are able to set up freeze traps that can encase an opponent in a solid block of ice as they walk over it, frost traps to slow movement considerably in a small radius, and snake traps which slow movement and cause damage. They can also scare beasts making them run  
around in fear for a while.  If specialized for it, hunters can also cast a scatter shot which disorients the target or a wyvern sting which puts the target to sleep.

Mages can use a spell called Polymorph to turn humanoid and beast type enemies into harmless sheep or other critters for 50 seconds (10 seconds in PvP), although the victim will regenerate health very quickly in this state. Any damage done to the target will remove the effect and will be in vain if the victim is polymorphed again, as the victim will regenerate to full health in just a few seconds. Mages can cripple their opponents' spell casting ability as well by using Counterspell, which will force the target to interrupt their spellcasting and block similar spells for a few seconds. The Frost Nova spell roots multiple targets in place around the mage for several seconds and can also be used for crowd control, while Blast Wave allows mages specialized in it to snare enemies in a radius.

Priests can perform an AoE fear every 30 seconds and they have the ability to Mind Control enemies. They also can shackle undead type enemies, rendering them unable to move or attack for 50 seconds.

Paladins can stun enemies for six seconds with the Hammer of Justice spell every minute and fear undead and demon monsters, preventing attacks and forcing them to run away.

Rogues, while in stealth and out of combat, are able to Sap a humanoid opponent that is not in combat, incapacitating it for up to one minute. Most methods of crowd control in WoW, will initiate combat with the target, so the victim will attack the player when the incapacitating effect wears off. However, Sap is a notable exception; neither the Sapped victim nor the surrounding enemies will engage in combat. Like most crowd control spells, the Sap effect will also be removed by any damage, but it cannot be applied repeatedly in combat. Rogues have other types of crowd control effects mostly for PvP combat, such as stuns, poisons.

Shamans have the ability to reduce a single opponent's movement speed (Frost Shock) and a group of opponents' movement speed (Earthbind Totem). They can also interrupt a target's spellcasting with Wind Shear, similarly to the way mages can with Counterspell, however Wind Shear's cooldown and duration of the spell block effect is lower. Hex, introduced in the Wrath of the Lich King expansion, allows shamans to turn enemies into a frog for a short period of time, rendering them unable to attack but free to move around.

Warlocks can banish elementals and demons, making them immune to everything, but unable to move or attack. Using a Succubus (a summoned demon), warlocks can seduce humanoids, causing them to stand love struck and unable to act. Warlocks can also cast Fear on their opponents, making them run around in panic.  There is no cooldown on this ability and it can affect any creature type.

Warriors have various stun and spell casting interrupt abilities.  Protection warriors (tanks) can stun a whole pack of enemies in front of them with their Shockwave ability. Warriors can also intimidate enemies around them with a fierce shout, making them run around or freeze in fear for a short time.

City of Heroes and City of Villains
In City of Heroes and its expansion, City of Villains, the Controller archetype is the primary provider of crowd control effects. Controllers, depending on their primary power set, have a variety of options for crowd control—essentially all of the effects in the above list—but the most commonly used effect is the Hold, which prevents an opponent from attacking or moving at all for a time. Dominators, a City of Villains archetype, share the Controllers' crowd control abilities, but with substantially reduced duration under most circumstances. To balance this limitation, a Dominator has access to an inherent power called "Domination." After a Dominator has inflicted enough damage with his or her attacks, this power can be activated, which doubles the duration and "magnitude" of his crowd control effects for a short time. Domination allows the Dominator, when it is most needed, to provide considerable crowd control and damage.

However, while Controllers and Dominators are designed to provide crowd control, all other archetypes have access to some crowd control effects; for instance, all Blasters have access to Immobilization effects in their secondary power sets. Crowd control in City of Heroes is generally very short in duration and not particularly effective on large groups of opponents or powerful opponents (such as Bosses, Archvillains, and Giant Monsters), in keeping with the game's design principles. This limitation is a function of "magnitude," which can be circumvented to a degree by using multiple crowd control effects or by augmenting magnitude using Domination. Because of these problems, crowd control is not considered an essential function in City of Heroes, and many groups operate effectively without a Controller or any appreciable use of crowd control effects by simply overwhelming their opponents with massive force. In Issue 5, all crowd control was substantially weakened by reducing the duration and increasing the recharge of powers that offer it, especially if those powers could affect multiple targets. This has further deemphasized its role in gameplay.

As in EverQuest, crowd control can also be provided by having a sufficiently resistant character, such as a Tanker, Scrapper, or Brute archetype character, keep the opponents occupied by "tanking" them. Tankers and Brutes are intended to be much more effective in this role, and it is not unheard of for a Tanker to "tank" upwards of 10 opponents at once and survive. Tankers, Scrappers, and Brutes all have powers that Taunt, which makes this task easier, but changes to the game in Issue 5 limit the number of targets that can be effectively controlled in this fashion, and the overall reduction in character defense makes tanking more dangerous. As of Issue 7, the Mastermind archetype has an inherent power called "Bodyguard" that, under specific circumstances, allows him to redistribute damage taken to his pets. Despite his limited hit points, a Mastermind can act as a "tank" using this power if carefully played.

In City of Heroes PvP combat, Controllers and Dominators who successfully Hold an opponent inflict triple normal damage with their powers. In Issue 5, Controllers gained a similar version of this advantage in the rest of the game through a new inherent power called "Containment." This power allows a Controller to inflict double damage against any target that is suffering from a Hold, Immobilize, Sleep, or Disorient effect. A similar version of Containment is part of the inherent power of Stalkers, Assassination. These characters have a chance to land a critical hit for double damage against any target under a Hold or Sleep effect in both PvP and PvE combat.

Ultima Online
In Ultima Online, the most common CC spells are Paralyze and Poison (although Poison is meant to be a debuff or damage over time, it also prevents a character from healing himself with certain methods).  There are other CC abilities that also prevent healing as well as a spell known as Force Field, meant to block passages.  Two skilled players can create a "cross" by casting Force Field along the X and Y axes of the map, locking the cum target in place for a time much longer than Paralyze.  This allows them to subsequently cast spells for a longer time without fear of retaliation from the target (unless the target can attack from afar, like archers and magical users).

MOBAs
In MOBAs, crowd control refers to anything which prevents or limits a player or mob’s ability to fight, as well as impair their ability to move. There are a wide variety of types of crowd control, and most player-controlled characters have some means of crowd control. The most common forms of CC are slows, which decrease the player’s movement, cripples which reduce attack speed, and stuns, which stop the player from moving or performing any actions. The support (tank) role will usually have more forms of CC than other roles due to their play-style being more about defense and area control.

There are also other forms of CC in MOBAs, including silences, which remove the player’s ability to cast spells or abilities; taunts, which force the player to run to a certain point or character (usually the caster of the taunt); hex, which transforms the player into a harmless creature and unable to perform any actions other than moving; fears, which force the player to run away from a certain point or character (usually the caster of the fear), and many other forms of CC that take place in their respective game.

Note

Video game terminology